Ritch is a given name and a surname. Notable people with the name include:

Given name:
Ritch Battersby of The Wildhearts, British rock group originally formed in Newcastle upon Tyne, England
Ritch Brinkley (born 1944), American character actor best known for playing William in Beauty and the Beast
Ritch Price, American college baseball coach, currently serving as head coach of the Kansas Jayhawks baseball team
Ritch Savin-Williams, Ph.D., (born 1949), professor of developmental psychology at Cornell University
Ritch Shydner (born 1952), American stand-up comedian, comic writer, and actor
Ritch Winter (born 1957), ice hockey sports agent
Ritch Workman (born 1973), Republican member of the Florida House of Representatives, representing the 52nd District

Surname:
David Ritch, OBE, JP (born 1951), prominent Cayman Islands attorney who has done private and governmental work
Michael Ritch (born 1973), American stock car racing driver, competed in 47 races across NASCAR's top three series between 1992 and 2002
Michael Ritch (soccer) (born 1981), American soccer striker, who last played for the Columbus Crew of Major League Soccer
Shannon Ritch (born 1970), American professional mixed martial artist currently competing in the Light Heavyweight division
Steven Ritch (1921–1995), American actor
Theodore Ritch (1894–1943), Russian tenor
William G. Ritch, acting Governor of the New Mexico Territory and a member of the Wisconsin State Senate

Other:
Big Dad Ritch, the lead vocalist of American heavy metal band Texas Hippie Coalition

See also
Rich (disambiguation)
Ritchey (disambiguation)
Ritchie (disambiguation)

fr:Ritch